MKZ or mkz may refer to:
 Lincoln MKZ, mid-size luxury car from the Lincoln Motor Company 
 Makasae language, a Papuan language (ISO 639-3)
 Malacca International Airport in Malaysia (IATA code)
 MKZ Medienkulturzentrum Dresden e. V. (Center for Media Culture), a research center of Dresden University of Technology